Qobad Bazn (also Romanized as Qobād Bazn and Qobādbezan) is a village in Kahak Rural District, Kahak District, Qom County, Qom Province, Iran. At the 2006 census, its population was 613, in 174 families.

There is a shrine (Shahzade Mohsen) and mosque in Qobad Bazn village and cemetery in the village's main square and near the shrine and the mosque was. Some names from the village Kavad father of Sassanid king Khosrow G. Anoushirvan know. Also near the village there are some works belonging to the Sassanid coins and statues as well as ancient objects have been discovered.

References 

 Satellite image of Qobadbezan

Populated places in Qom Province